The 1912 Southwestern Moundbuilders football team represented Southwestern College in the 1912 college football season. On November 8, 1912, Southwestern defeated Fairmont College (now Wichita State University) by a score of 41 to 3. This was the first of a series of wins where Southwestern would beat or tie Fairmont ten of eleven games. This period of time earned the school the name "The Jinx" for many years to come.

References

Southwestern
Southwestern Moundbuilders football seasons
Southwestern Moundbuilders football